David Alan Dunning is an American social psychologist and professor of psychology at the University of Michigan. He is a retired professor of psychology at Cornell University.

Education
He received his BA from Michigan State University in 1982 and PhD from Stanford University in 1986, both in psychology.

Research
Dunning has published more than 80 peer-reviewed papers, book chapters, and commentaries. He is well known for co-authoring a 1999 study with graduate student Justin Kruger after reading about two 1995 robberies in which the perpetrators wore lemon juice instead of masks, thinking it would make them invisible to security cameras. This study showed that people who performed the lowest at certain tasks, such as judging humor, grammar, and logic, significantly overestimated how good they were at these tasks. This study has since given rise to what is known as the Dunning–Kruger effect, a cognitive bias in which people mistakenly assess their cognitive ability as greater than it is. The study also found that people who performed slightly above average at identifying how funny a given joke was tended to be the most accurate at assessing how good they were at the assigned tasks, and that those who performed the best tended to think they performed only slightly above average. In 2012, Dunning told Ars Technica that he "thought the paper would never be published" and that he was "struck just with how long and how much this idea has gone viral in so many areas."

Positions
Dunning is the executive officer of the Society for Personality and Social Psychology and the Foundation for Personality and Social Psychology. He has also served as an associate editor of the Journal of Personality and Social Psychology.

Awards 
In 2021, Dunning was listed by Stanford University as being in the world's top 2% most cited psychological scientists.

References

20th-century births
Year of birth missing (living people)
Place of birth missing (living people)
Living people
American social psychologists
Cornell University faculty
Stanford University alumni
University of Michigan faculty
Michigan State University alumni
20th-century American psychologists
21st-century American psychologists